The 1955–56 Swedish Division I season was the twelfth season of Swedish Division I. Sodertalje SK won the league title by finishing first in the final round.

First round

Northern Group

Southern Group

Final round

External links
 1955–56 season

Swe
Swedish Division I seasons
1955–56 in Swedish ice hockey